Bébé Lilly (also known as Lilly Baba or Baby Lilly) is an animated baby girl singer in France. She has released thirteen singles, mainly in French, but several have also been recorded in other languages. She also has four albums and a DVD. Many of her songs have been ranked on top ten hits lists in Lebanon.

Discography

Albums

1 Also released under the titles Este e o meu mundo (Portugal), Il mio mondo (Italy) and Meine Welt (Austria) 
2 Also released under the titles Super Bébé (Portugal), A világ körü and Dookoła świata

Singles

1 Also released under the titles "Hallo Papi" (Portugal) and "Ciao Papi" (Italy)
2 Also released under the title "La giungla degli animali" (Italy)

DVD

1 Also released under the title O meu (Portugal)
2 Also released under the title O meu das ferias (Portugal)

 Karaoke Z Bébé Lilly was certified Gold and peaked at #21 in Poland.

See also
Titou Le Lapinou
Pinocchio (singer)
Ilona Mitrecey

References

Fictional singers